The Women's points race competition at the 2022 UCI Track Cycling World Championships will be held on 16 October 2022.

Results
The race was started at 13:30.

References

Women's points race